This is a list of speakers of the Parliament of Lebanon since the office was created in 1922.

National Pact
Though the constitution does not require so, an unwritten understanding between the Shia, Sunni, and Maronite leaderships in Lebanon in 1943, known as the National Pact, has resulted in the holder of the post being a Shia in every electoral cycle since that time.

List of speakers

State of Greater Lebanon, part of the French Mandate (1922–1943)

Administrative Committee
The Administrative Committee was the first legislative body of Lebanon, established by the French Mandate in 1922, two years after founding the State of Greater Lebanon.

Representative Councils
In 1922, the Representative Council of Lebanon was announced, representing different sects and areas.

Senate
In 1926, the Senate of Lebanon was formed by the constitution, but abolished the next year.

Parliament
The Parliament was established in 1926 by the constitution, and was merged with the Senate in 1927.

Lebanese Republic (1943–present)

Lebanese Parliament
In 1943, the Lebanese Republic was established, marking the end of the French mandate for Lebanon.

See also

 President of Lebanon
 List of presidents of Lebanon
 Prime Minister of Lebanon
 List of prime ministers of Lebanon
 List of deputy prime ministers of Lebanon
 Deputy Speaker of the Parliament of Lebanon
 Lists of office-holders

References

 
Politics of Lebanon
Lebanon
Government of Lebanon
Parliament, Speakers
Lebanon politics-related lists